Echinacea sanguinea, the sanguine purple coneflower, is a herbaceous perennial native to open sandy fields and open pine woods and prairies in eastern Texas, southeastern Oklahoma, Louisiana, and southwestern Arkansas. It is the southernmost Echinacea species. The specific epithet sanguinea, which is Latin for "blood", refers to the color of the petals.

Echinacea sanguinea is herbaceous perennial up to 120 cm (3 ft) tall with an unbranched stem. The alternate leaves are typically close to the ground, growing 10–25 cm (4–10 in) long and 6 mm (¼ in) wide, with the upper leaves having long hairs. Each stem has one rose-pink to pale purple flower head, up to 5 cm (2 in) long and 12 mm (½ in) wide, with 10–20 ray flowers that conspicuously droop. The 2.5 cm (1 in) cone-shaped center containing the disc florets is purplish-brown on the outside and greenish toward the center.

References

External links

sanguinea
Flora of the Southern United States
Plants described in 1840